The 2004 Senior League World Series took place from August 15–21 in Bangor, Maine, United States. Freehold Township, New Jersey defeated El Rio, California in the championship game.

Teams

Results

Group A

Group B

Elimination Round

References

Senior League World Series
Senior League World Series